Sagmariasus verreauxi is a species of spiny lobster that lives around northern New Zealand, the Kermadec Islands the Chatham Islands and Australia from Queensland to Tasmania.

Names

The species has many common names in English, including Australian crayfish, common crayfish, common Sydney crayfish, eastern crayfish, eastern rock lobster, green cray, green crayfish, green lobster, green rock lobster, marine crayfish, New South Wales spiny lobster, packhorse crayfish, packhorse lobster, sea crayfish, smooth-tailed crayfish and Sydney crayfish. In Māori, it is called . S. verreauxi was formerly included in the genus Jasus, but has been separated into a monotypic genus Sagmariasus due to the lack of sculpturation on the abdomen, which is found in all other Jasus species. The name Sagmarasius derives from the Greek  (sagmarion), meaning packhorse, and the genus name Jasus, in reference to the common name "packhorse crayfish".

References

Further reading
 

Achelata
Edible crustaceans
Monotypic decapod genera
Marine crustaceans of New Zealand
Taxa named by Lipke Holthuis